Urana  is a small town in the Riverina region of New South Wales, Australia. The town is in the Federation Council local government area.

To the west lies Lake Urana and the Lake Urana Nature Reserve. To the east lies a smaller lake, Lake Uranagong.

Urana was the major town and headquarters of the former Urana Shire.  The shire included the localities of Boree Creek, Morundah, Oaklands and Rand. The Urana district is used for raising sheep and for growing wheat and other grain crops.

Aboriginal and Torres Strait Islander people made up 3.7% of the population.

History
Urana was first settled by Europeans during the 1850s. In May 1859 a design for the "Town of Urana" by Surveyor Hayes was approved by the New South Wales Executive Council.  The name Urana comes from the Aboriginal word 'airana', meaning a temporary shelter (usually consisting of a simple frame of branches covered with bark, leaves, or grass).

Urana Post Office opened on 1 January 1861.

In August 1863 near Urana the notorious bushranger, Dan 'Mad Dog' Morgan, and his accomplice Clarke held up the Police Magistrate based at Wagga Wagga, Henry Baylis.  A few days after this incident Baylis led a party of policemen to the bushrangers' camp; shots were exchanged and both Baylis and the bushranger Clarke were wounded.  Morgan and Clarke both escaped on this occasion.

In 1866 Urana township consisted of two public houses, the Urana Hotel and the Royal Hotel.  In addition there was a post-office, two large stores, and a police-station and lock-up. A new court-house was erected at Urana in 1879.  During 1882 a Roman Catholic church was completed, with Father Burmingham celebrating the first service on 7 January 1883.

The Rev. George Wilson Adam was the first Presbyterian minister of the separate parish of Urana (at that time administered from Victoria).  Rev. Adam's term extended from 1878 to 1887.  His successor, Rev. Matthew Bell, was a part of the Presbyterian Church of New South Wales; he was inducted in 1888 and resigned in 1904.  During Rev. Bell's tenure at Urana three wooden churches were built: one at Urana, and one each at the district preaching centres, Old Goree and Boree Creek.

Urana Shire Council was proclaimed in 1906 and dissolved in 2016, to become part of the Federation Council.

Sport and Recreation
The Urana Football Club was an Australian Rules Football club established in April, 1898 at a meeting in the Commercial Hotel. Urana's first published match was against Lockhart in August, 1898, losing by four goals to a more experienced side. In 1901, Urana won all there games they played in. In 1909 the Urana & District Football Association was formed at a meeting from the following club's - Daysdale, Oaklands and Urana.

Former Corowa Football Club premiership coach, Ray "Nana" Baker was coach of Urana Football Club  in 1934.

Former Urana footballer, Max Urquhart was recruited to Collingwood Football Club in 1963.

Competitions played in
The Urana FC played in the following competitions.
1909 - Urana & District Football Association
1911 - 1914: Lockhart & District Football Association. Premiers - 1914
1915 - Club active but did not play in any official competition.
1916 - 1918: Club in recess due to World War One.
1919 - 1920: Club active but did not play in any official competition.
1921 - 1922:  - Lockhart & District Football Association. 1921 Premiers: Pleasant Hills 
1923 - The Rock Oaklands Lines Football Association: Premiers - Oaklands FC
1924 - The Lockhart Oaklands Lines Football Association: Premiers - Oaklands FC
1925 - 1926 - Club in recess.
1927 - 1928: Club reformed in May, 1927. Club active but did not play in any official competition.
1929 - 1930: Coreen & District Football League: Urana applied for admission into the Coreen & District Football League in 1929, but were initially knocked back. 
1931 - Southern Riverina Football Association
1932 - 1935: Corowa & District Football Association
1936 - 1937: Faithful & District Football Association 
1938 - Club in recess.
1939 - 1945: Club in recess due to World War Two.
1946 - 1972:  Coreen & District Football League. Merged with Cullivel in 1946 and played in the Coreen & District Football League from 1946 to 1972 as Urana Cullivel FC. Premiers: 1953, 1957, 1958, 1959, 1966, 1967.
1973 - 2003: Coreen & District Football League. Played as the Urana FC. Thirds Premiers: 1989
2004 - 2007: Coreen & District Football League. Merged with Oaklands FC to form the Billabong Crows in 2004.
2008 - 2022: Hume Football League. Played as the Billabong Crows FC

Heritage listings
Urana has a number of heritage-listed sites, including:
 Anna Street: Urana Soldiers' Memorial Hall

Climate

Notable residents
Notable people from Urana include:
 Dame Ella Macknight
 Rugby league player Norm Provan
 Singer Billy Field
 Geelong AFL Player Bill Brownless was born at the Urana Hospital 
 Collingwood footballer, Max Urquhart                                                         
 The Queen's milliner Fred Fox

Gallery

External links

References

Towns in the Riverina
Towns in New South Wales
Federation Council, New South Wales